4647 Syuji, provisional designation , is a dark background asteroid from the outer regions of the asteroid belt, approximately  in diameter. It was discovered on 9 October 1931, by German astronomer Karl Reinmuth at the Heidelberg Observatory in southwest Germany. The likely carbonaceous asteroid was named for Japanese astronomer Shuji Hayakawa.

Orbit and classification 

Syuji is a non-family asteroid from the main belt's background population. It orbits the Sun in the outer main-belt at a distance of 2.1–3.6 AU once every 4 years and 11 months (1,795 days; semi-major axis of 2.89 AU). Its orbit has an eccentricity of 0.26 and an inclination of 7° with respect to the ecliptic. The body's observation arc begins at Heidelberg on 17 October 1931, or eight nights after its official discovery observation. orbital read

Physical characteristics 

Syuji has an absolute magnitude of 12.8. Based on the body's albedo (see below) and its location in the asteroid belt, it is likely a carbonaceous asteroid. As of 2018, no rotational lightcurve of Syuji has been obtained from photometric observations. The body's rotation period, pole and shape remain unknown.

Diameter and albedo 

According to the survey carried out by the NEOWISE mission of NASA's Wide-field Infrared Survey Explorer, Syuji measures 13.864 kilometers in diameter and its surface has an albedo of 0.063.

Naming 

This minor planet was named after Japanese astronomer Shuji Hayakawa (born 1958; first name also spelled "Syuji" or "Shūji"), an observer of comets and discoverer of minor planets at the Okutama Observatory  in Okutama, west of Tokyo. The official naming was proposed by Takao Kobayashi and the citation was published by the Minor Planet Center on 25 May 1994.

References

External links 
 Dictionary of Minor Planet Names, Google books
 Discovery Circumstances: Numbered Minor Planets (1)-(5000) – Minor Planet Center
 
 

004647
Discoveries by Karl Wilhelm Reinmuth
Named minor planets
19311009